David Anthony Bramlett (born June 29, 1941) is a retired United States Army four-star general who commanded United States Army Forces Command from July 1, 1996 to August 31, 1998, after serving as Deputy Commander in Chief and Chief of Staff, United States Pacific Command at Camp H. M. Smith, Hawaii. During his tenure as Deputy Commander, he was the interim commander of Pacific Command after the commander, Admiral Richard C. Macke, came under fire for comments he had made in regard to the 1995 rape scandal in Okinawa that involved three United States servicemen.

Military career
Entering the United States Army from Imperial Beach, California, Bramlett graduated from the United States Military Academy in 1964 and was commissioned a second lieutenant of Infantry. His first assignment was as a platoon leader in Company B, 1st Battalion, 14th Infantry Regiment, 25th Infantry Division, Hawaii.

Bramlett served in South Vietnam from December 1965 to November 1966, as aide-de-camp for the Assistant Division Commander, 25th Infantry Division, and later company executive officer, C/1-14 Infantry. His second tour, from September 1968 to August 1969, included rifle company command of C/2-327th Infantry, 101st Airborne Division and assistant brigade S-3, 1st Brigade.

Bramlett's numerous command and staff positions include commander, 1st Battalion, 503rd Infantry, 3rd Brigade, 101st Airborne Division (Air Assault), Fort Campbell, Kentucky; commander, 1st Brigade, 82nd Airborne Division, Fort Bragg, North Carolina; commander, 3rd Brigade, 101st Airborne Division (Air Assault); and as Commanding General, 6th Infantry Division (Light), Fort Wainwright, Alaska. He also served as Assistant Chief of Staff, G-1, 101st Airborne Division; and as Assistant Chief of Staff, G-3/Director Plans and Training, XVIII Airborne Corps, Fort Bragg.

Bramlett's career also includes tours of duty as Deputy Director, Plans, Policy and Programs Directorate, United States Central Command, MacDill Air Force Base, Florida and Assistant Division Commander, 25th Infantry Division, Hawaii. Prior to assuming command of the 6th Infantry Division (Light), he was Commandant of Cadets, United States Military Academy, West Point, New York, from 1989 to 1992.

Bramlett's instructor tours include the Florida Ranger Camp, 1967–68, and the Department of English at West Point for three years after earning a master's degree from Duke University in 1972. He attended the Advanced Course at the United States Army Armor School, the Command and General Staff College, and the Army War College.

Awards and decorations
Bramlett's military awards include the Defense Distinguished Service Medal, the Army Distinguished Service Medal with oak leaf cluster, Silver Star, Legion of Merit, Bronze Star Medal  with "V" device with five oak leaf clusters, and the Defense Meritorious Service Medal. He also wears the Combat Infantryman Badge, Senior Parachutist Badge, Air Assault Badge, and Ranger Tab.

Relations
Bramlett is the son of Jayne E. Bramlett and the Robert H. Bramlett, USN (retired), of National City, California. He is married to the former Judith Ann Cassidy. They have one son, Robert.

Post-military career
After retiring from the military, Bramlett became the vice president of the Hawaii Army Museum Society. He also currently serves as an adjunct professor at Hawaii Pacific University, teaching graduate seminars in U.S. Military History, the American Way of War and War Literature.

References

1941 births
Living people
People from Galesburg, Illinois
United States Army generals
United States Military Academy alumni
Commandants of the Corps of Cadets of the United States Military Academy
United States Army personnel of the Vietnam War
Recipients of the Distinguished Service Medal (US Army)
Recipients of the Silver Star
Recipients of the Legion of Merit
Duke University alumni
People from Imperial Beach, California
United States Army Command and General Staff College alumni
Recipients of the Defense Distinguished Service Medal
United States Army War College alumni
Military personnel from California
Military personnel from Illinois